J.D.T. de Bienville (born 1726 in Cevennes - died August 3, 1813, in Paris) whose real name is Jean Baptiste Louis de Thesacq, was a French doctor of the 18th century. He practiced in France, notably in the vicinity of Tours in 1761 and in the United Provinces, notably in The Hague and Rotterdam. He is the author of various medical treatises. One of his works, La Nymphomanie, published in 1771 and which poses as the counterpart to the famous treatise on onanism by Samuel-Auguste Tissot, met with a certain success, as evidenced by the numerous reissues and translations of which he has is about.

Works 

 La Nymphomanie, ou Traité de la fureur utérine, Amsterdam, Marc-Michel Rey, 1771
 Recherches théoriques et pratiques sur la petite vérole, Amsterdam, Barthelemi Vlam
 Traité des erreurs populaires sur la santé, La Haye, Pierre-Frédéric Gosse, 1775
Réflexions importantes sur les abus de la saignée, Amsterdam, J.-F. Rosart, 1781
Le Pour et le Contre de l'inoculation de la petite vérole, Rotterdam, s.n., s.d.

References 

1726 births
1813 deaths
French physicians
18th-century French physicians